Diao Xiaojuan (born 15 March 1986) is a track cyclist representing Hong Kong. She competed in the 2009, 2010, 2011, 2012, 2013, 2014 and 2015 UCI Track Cycling World Championships. In 2008, she was recruited by coach Shen Jinkang (沈金康) to join the Hong Kong cycling team.

Career results
2008
1st Scratch Race, International Track Challenge Vienna 
2014
Hong Kong International Track Cup
1st Scratch Race
3rd Omnium
1st Points Race, Japan Track Cup 1
1st Omnium, Japan Track Cup 2
2015
1st Omnium, Hong Kong International Track Cup
Track Clubs ACC Cup
1st Scratch Race
2nd Omnium
2nd  Omnium, Asian Track Championships
2017
Asian Track Championships
2nd Team Pursuit (with Leung Bo Yee, Pang Yao and Yang Qianyu)
3rd  Scratch Race
2nd Scratch Race, Taiwan Cup Track International Classic II

References

1986 births
Hong Kong female cyclists
Living people
Cyclists from Fujian
Olympic cyclists of Hong Kong
Cyclists at the 2016 Summer Olympics
Cyclists at the 2010 Asian Games
Cyclists at the 2014 Asian Games
Cyclists at the 2018 Asian Games
Asian Games competitors for Hong Kong